Račice is a municipality and village in Litoměřice District in the Ústí nad Labem Region of the Czech Republic. It has about 300 inhabitants. It is the major rowing and flatwater canoeing venue in the Czech Republic.

Etymology
The name is derived from the personal name Radek, meaning "the village of Radek's people". It was originally written as Radčice.

Geography
It lies in the Lower Eger Table. The municipality is situated in a meander of the Elbe River on its left bank, and the river forms part of the municipal border.

History
The first written mention of Račice is from 1268.

Sport

Račice is the major rowing and flatwater canoeing venue in the country. The municipality hosted the 1993 World Rowing Championships and 2017 ICF Canoe Sprint World Championships, as well as the 2017 European Rowing Championships and the 2006 and 2015 Canoe Sprint European Championships. It also hosted the 2022 World Rowing Championships.

References

External links

Labe Aréna Račice sports centre

Villages in Litoměřice District
Rowing venues
Canoeing and kayaking venues